St. Ambrose Cathedral may refer to:

St. Ambrose Cathedral, Linares, Chile
St. Ambrose Cathedral (Des Moines, Iowa), United States

See also
 St. Ambrose Church (disambiguation)